Willy Schwarz (born 8 December 1906 in Göttingen, died 1982) was a German physician and anatomist, who was Professor and held the second chair in anatomy at the Free University of Berlin from 1966 to 1976. He obtained his Habilitation in 1937, and taught at the University of Jena and the University of Königsberg prior to 1945. From 1949, he was employed at the Free University of Berlin, as Adjunct Professor (apl. Professor) 1949–1951, as Professor Extraordinarius (ao. Professor) 1951–1966 and as Professor Ordinarius from 1966. He was Director of the Research Department for Electron Microscopy and of the Institute for Anatomy.

Selected publications
Elektronenmikroskopische Untersuchungen über die Differenzierung der cornea-und Sklerafibrillen des Menschen, Zeitschrift für Zellforschung und Mikroskopische Anatomie, 1953, Volume 38, Issue 1, pp 78–86
Elektronenmikroskopische Untersuchungen über den Aufbau der Sklera und der Cornea des Menschen, Zeitschrift für Zellforschung und Mikroskopische Anatomie, 1953, Volume 38, Issue 1, pp 26–49
Elektronenmikroskopische Untersuchungen an der Interzellularsubstanz des menschlichen Knochengewebes, Zeitschrift für Zellforschung und Mikroskopische Anatomie, 1953, Volume 38, Issue 5, pp 475–487
Die Hodenzwischenzellen der Ratte nach Hypophysektomie und nach Behandlung mit Choriongonadotropin und Amphenon B, Zeitschrift für Zellforschung und Mikroskopische Anatomie, 1964, Volume 65, Issue 2, pp 272–284

References

German physiologists
Academic staff of the University of Jena
Academic staff of the University of Königsberg
Academic staff of the Free University of Berlin
20th-century German physicians
1906 births
1982 deaths